The Somali cat is genetically similar to the Abyssinian cat. Due to inheriting 2 copies of the recessive gene for long hair, they have a characteristic luscious coat, unlike their cousin the Abyssinian.

History 
In the 1940s, a British breeder named Janet Robertson exported some Abyssinian kittens to Australia, New Zealand and North America. Descendants of these cats occasionally produced kittens with long or fuzzy coats. In 1963, Mary Mailing, a breeder from Canada, entered one into a local pet show. Ken McGill, the show's judge, asked for one for breeding purposes.

The first known long-haired Abyssinian, named 'Raby Chuffa of Selene', appeared in America in 1953. Breeders assume that the long-haired gene was passed down through his ancestry. Most breeders were appalled by the sudden difference in appearance in their litters and refused to mention them. However, some breeders were intrigued and continued to breed the long-haired Abyssinian. At first, other Abyssinian breeders looked down upon the new development of the Somali and refused to associate them with the Abyssinian. They worked hard to keep the long-haired gene out of their own cats.

An American Abyssinian breeder Evelyn Mague also received longhairs from her cats, which she named "Somalis". Mague put out a call for other cats to breed with her own long-haired Abyssinians and found the many other breeders internationally that had been breeding long-haired Abyssinians for several years already. Don Richings, another Canadian breeder, used kittens from McGill, and began to work with Mague. The first Somali recognized as such by a fancier organization was Mayling Tutsuta, one of McGill's cats. In 1979, the breed was recognized by the CFA in North America. The new breed was accepted in Europe in 1982. By 1991, the breed was broadly (though not universally) accepted internationally.

The name "Somali" is in reference to the African nation, Somalia. Somalia borders Abyssinia, which is modern day Ethiopia. The name of the breed is a unique interpretation of the Ethiopian-Somali conflict; Mague charitably assumed that since the land borders were a human creation, so are the genetic borders between the Abyssinian cat and the long-haired Abyssinian.

Mague also founded the Somali Cat Club of America, which included members from Canada as well. The SCCA worked to grant the breed championship status by the CFA, which occurred in 1979. In 1975, the CFA founded the International Somali Cat Club.

Appearance

Description 
Somalis are recognized for their energetic and social nature.  Their appearance with sleek bodies, long tails, and large pointed ears have earned them the nickname of "Fox Cat." Their ticked coats contain between four and twenty colors on each hair are very fine in texture making their coats softer to the touch than those of other cat breeds. The cat itself is medium-large in size.

Colors and patterns 
The usual or ruddy Somali is golden brown ticked with black. There are 28 colors of Somali in total although certain organizations accept only some of these colors. All organizations that register Somalis permit usual (also known as ruddy), sorrel (a.k.a. red), blue, and fawn. Most clubs also recognize usual/ruddy silver, sorrel/red silver, blue silver, and fawn silver. Other colors that may be accepted by some registries include chocolate, lilac, red, cream, usual-tortie, sorrel-tortie, blue-tortie, fawn-tortie, chocolate-tortie, lilac-tortie, and silver variants of these (e.g. blue-tortie silver).

Health 
The Somali cat is usually healthy, with few breed-related health issues, though some problems may occur. These include gingivitis, tooth decay, and renal amyloidosis, which are also seen in many other breeds of cats. Renal amyloidosis (often called RA) is a condition in which there is a deposition of the protein amyloid in various tissues which hinders that part of the body's normal functioning. Other problems that are prevalent in most cat breeds, the Somali included, are feline infectious anemia (FIA) and autoimmune-mediated hemolytic anemia (AIHA). Some AIHA-related diseases are inherited erythrocyte disorders, such as pyruvate kinase deficiency and osmotic fragility.

Recently found in cats has been myelodysplasia. It is normally known to affect humans but was recently found in a litter of Somali kittens. Like AIHA, myelodysplasia causes anemia and is speculated to be the cause of anemia in Somalis in the past.

Somalis may also have hereditary retinal degeneration due to a mutation in the rdAc allele. This mutation is also seen in Abyssinians, Siamese cats, and other related breeds.

References

External links 

 Cat Fanciers Association -- Somali
 The International Cat Association -- Somali
 Somali cat club of Great Britain

Cat breeds